Mr Meecher, the Uncool Teacher is a British comic strip, published in the British comics magazine The Dandy. It debuted in the 3516th issue  on 8 January 2011  and is written and drawn by Wilbur Dawbarn.

Concept

The comic strip centers around an uncool young teacher who tries to be accepted by his pupils, but always fails. Meecher's catchphrase is 'You can call me Trevor', but one of the running jokes is no-one ever does. He's always referred to as 'Sir' or 'Meech' by his class "mates", and 'Trevelyan' by his mother. The strip ended its first series in Issue 3525 when Meecher was abducted by aliens.

Popularity

Mr Meecher featured in a readers' poll in February 2011 allowing the readers to decide which characters would get the axe and which would continue. Overall Mr Meecher came fourth getting beaten only by Harry Hill, Desperate Dan and Pre-Skool Prime Minister.

Continuation

His second run began in July 2011 and ended in July 2012 with 46 strips.

A third series began in issue 3598 (15 September 2012) as a three-panel strip. It survived in this format until the final issue (3610).

References

Dandy strips
School-themed comics
Fictional schoolteachers
Gag-a-day comics
2011 comics debuts
2012 comics endings
British comics characters
Male characters in comics
Comics set in the United Kingdom